Greece was represented by 2 athletes at the 1934 European Athletics Championships held in Turin, Italy.

Medals

References

http://www.sansimera.gr/articles/804

1934
1934 in Greek sport
Nations at the 1934 European Athletics Championships